The Board of Governors of the United States Postal Service is the governing body of the United States Postal Service (USPS). The board oversees the activities of the Postal Service, while the postmaster general actively manages its day-to-day operations.

The board directs "the exercise of the power" of the Postal Service, controls its expenditures, and reviews its practices and policies. It consists of 11 members; 6 are requisite to achieve an ordinary quorum. Of the 11 board members, 9 are the presidentially appointed governors, 1 is the postmaster general, and 1 is the deputy postmaster general. The 9 governors elect the postmaster general, the chairman of the board as well as the USPS inspector general; the governors and the postmaster general elect the deputy postmaster general. No more than five governors may belong to the same political party. The board also has the power to remove all of these officers.

The Board of Governors is comparable with the board of directors of most private corporations.

History
Until 2007, each governor was appointed to a nine-year term or to the remainder of the unexpired term of a vacant seat. The terms of the nine appointed governors are staggered,  commence after Senate confirmation and expire on December 8 of the year that the term would have ended had the terms been properly synchronized. The board can extend the term of a governor whose term is to expire by one year or until a successor has been confirmed, without Senate confirmation. Governors may be appointed for a second term, with Senate confirmation. No more than five of the nine governors may be of the same political party. The Postal Accountability and Enhancement Act, signed by President George W. Bush on December 20, 2006, besides other things, changed the terms of governors appointed after that date from nine to seven years.

On November 14, 2014 (with effect on February 1, 2015), the board appointed Megan Brennan postmaster general, to succeed Patrick R. Donahoe. In December 2014, the extended term of Mickey D. Barnett was to expire, while the Senate had still not confirmed five nominees submitted by then-president Obama. Just before the loss of its quorum, the board delegated its authority to a “Temporary Emergency Committee“ (TEC) comprising the board members for the time being, with the same authority as the board had with 9 appointed members, but without the quorum requirement. After December 2014, there were three appointed board members (James Bilbray, Ellen Williams and Louis J. Giuliano) as well as the postmaster general, Patrick R. Donahoe, and the deputy PMG, Ron Stroman, a total of five of the 11 members, and not enough to constitute a quorum. Megan Brennan became an ex officio member of the board on February 1, 2015.  The extended terms of Ellen Williams and Louis J. Giuliano both expired in December 2015, and James Bilbray became the sole remaining appointed member. His nine-year term was extended by one year and he ceased to be a member in December 2016. At that point there were no appointed members on the board, and the PMG (Megan Brennan) and deputy PMG (Ron Stroman) made up the TEC.

In October 2017, then-president Donald Trump nominated three individuals to the board: Robert (Mike) Duncan, a former White House official during the George W. Bush administration, Calvin Tucker, and David Williams, former USPS inspector general. On August 28, 2018, the Senate confirmed Mike Duncan as chairman, and David Williams, as vice-chairman. On November 29, 2018, the governors appointed Tammy L. Whitcomb the USPS inspector general.

On August 1, 2019, the Senate confirmed three more nominations, allowing the board to reach a quorum for the first time since 2014. The new members are Ron Bloom and Roman Martinez IV, both former investment bankers, and John Barger, former director of the Investment and Retirement Boards of the Los Angeles County Employees Retirement Association, the country's largest pension fund.

In March 2020, Trump nominated Donald L. Moak to replace Alan C. Kessler (who had resigned in July 2011) and nominated William D. Zollars to replace James Bilbray (who had ceased being a member in December 2016). David C. Williams resigned from the board on April 30, 2020, and Ron Stroman resigned on June 1, 2020, as deputy PMG. On June 15, 2020, the TEC, comprising five members, selected Louis DeJoy to succeed Megan Brennan as Postmaster General (PMG). The Senate confirmed both nominations on June 18, 2020. , the board had six appointed members plus the postmaster general, sufficient to constitute a quorum on the board. Five of the board members are Republicans.

There were calls in January 2021 for President Joe Biden to quickly fill the vacant seats on the USPS Board of Governors. Critics including union members note the politicization of the USPS, the mishandling of absentee ballots during the 2020 elections, and ongoing delivery delays. Mark Dimondstein, president of the American Postal Workers Union also noted the lack of diversity on the current board: all members are men, there are no African Americans, and there is no one from a rural area. Philip F. Rubio, a history professor at North Carolina A&T State University, notes that the board is accountable to no one and the postmaster general is accountable only to the Board. Rubio has described Louis DeJoy's changes as "sabotage", and Congressman Bill Pascrell, (D-NJ) said, "Fire everybody at the top. They've done a lousy job." Dimondstein has suggested improving services by including financial services such as paycheck cashing, installing ATMs, and handling bill paying and overseas remittances.

On May 12, 2022, the United States Senate confirmed Dan Tangherlini (former head of the General Services Administration) to serve through December 2027 and Derek Kan (former deputy director of the Office of Management and Budget) through December 2028. They replace members Ron Bloom and John Barger.

Responsibilities
The board directs the exercise of the powers of the Postal Service, directs and controls its expenditures, reviews its practices, conducts long-range planning, and sets policies on all postal matters. The board takes up matters such as service standards, capital investments, and facilities projects exceeding $25 million. It also approves officer compensation. The board generally meets once a month. Each January, the governors elect a chairman and a vice-chairman. Each governor receives $300 per day for not more than 42 days of meetings each year and travel expenses, in addition to an annual salary of $30,000. The governors employ a full-time corporate secretary who serves as the primary staff assistant to the board.

Current members
Members may serve for one year beyond the expiration of their term or until a successor is confirmed. President Joe Biden nominated former general counsel of the American Postal Workers Union Anton Hajjar and voting rights activist Amber McReynolds on February 25, 2021. On March 15, 2021, the nomination of former Deputy Postmaster General Ron Stroman was sent to the Senate. President Biden nominated Stroman to the seat vacated by Ellen Williams.

On May 12, 2021, Stroman was confirmed to a term as governor expiring December 8, 2021 in a 69–30 vote. The Senate later confirmed a separate nomination for him to serve a term as governor expiring December 8, 2028. The U.S. Senate invoked cloture for McReynolds May 12, 2021 and confirmed her on May 13, 2021. Hajjar was confirmed on May 28, 2021.

On November 19, 2021, President Biden announced his intention to nominate Derek Kan and Dan Tangherlini to replace John M. Barger and Ron A. Bloom, respectively. Both Bloom and Barger were key allies of Louis DeJoy and had their terms expire on December 8, 2021. Bloom was replaced as chairman of the board by Roman Martinez IV on January 12, 2022. Biden's nominees Kan and Tangherlini received Senate confirmation on May 12, 2022, and took office shortly thereafter.

Note that the members of this board are appointed- they did not run for office, and hence did not run under the auspices of any given party.  The "political party" column of the table should not be interpreted to mean otherwise.

Former members

References

External links

United States Postal Service